Sean McManus Guenther (born December 29, 1995) is an American professional baseball pitcher in the Detroit Tigers organization. He made his MLB debut in 2021 with the Miami Marlins.

Amateur career
A native of Atlanta, Georgia, Guenther attended Marist School in Brookhaven, Georgia.  He graduated from high school in 2014. Guenther committed to play baseball for the Fighting Irish baseball team of the University of Notre Dame. In his freshman season, Guenther was named a Louisville Slugger Freshman All-American and named on the ACC All-Freshman team as well as leading the Irish with five saves. In 2015, Guenther posted a 1–3 record with a 2.72 ERA and a 1.295 WHIP in his freshman season. In his Sophomore season, Guenther posted a 3–5 record, 4.62 ERA, and a 1.369 WHIP with 11 starts and 15 total appearances in 2016. After the 2016 season, Guenther played collegiate summer baseball for the Orleans Firebirds of the Cape Cod Baseball League. In his junior year, Guenther posted a 2–6 record, a 2.64 ERA, 1.328 WHIP, and seven saves. After his junior year, Guenther was drafted by the Miami Marlins in the seventh round (209th Overall) of the 2017 MLB Draft.

Professional career

Miami Marlins
To begin his professional baseball career, Guenther was assigned to the Gulf Coast League Marlins of the Gulf Coast League in 2017. In three starts and four total games with the GCL Marlins, Guenther only allowed one run, five hits, and eleven strikeouts in 11 innings. Guenther was quickly promoted to the Batavia Muckdogs of the New York-Penn League. In 40 innings with the Muckdogs, Guenther posted a 1–4 record with thirty-three strikeouts and a 3.83 ERA. For the 2018 season, Guenther was assigned to the Jupiter Hammerheads of the Florida State League. Early struggles with the Hammerheads had Guenther demoted to the Greensboro Grasshoppers of the Single A South Atlantic League. Guenther also appeared in a rehab game with the GCL Marlins in 2018. In 2019, Guenther appeared with the Clinton LumberKings of the Midwest League and with the Jupiter Hammerheads. Guenther did not appear with a team in 2020 because of the COVID-19 pandemic.

To begin the 2021 season, Guenther was assigned to the Pensacola Blue Wahoos of Double-A South. In 17.2 innings with Pensacola, Guenther posted a 1–0 record with a 1.02 ERA and 28 strikeouts. On June 8, Guenther was promoted to the Jacksonville Jumbo Shrimp of Triple-A East. On August 4, Guenther was called up by the Marlins and made his debut 2 days later.

On April 7, 2022, Guenther underwent Tommy John surgery, ending his 2022 season before it began.

Detroit Tigers
On November 2, 2022, Guenther was claimed off waivers by the Detroit Tigers. He was sent outright to Triple-A on November 19, 2022.

References

External links

UND Fighting Irish bio

1995 births
Living people
Baseball players from Atlanta
Major League Baseball pitchers
Miami Marlins players
Notre Dame Fighting Irish baseball players
Orleans Firebirds players
Gulf Coast Marlins players
Batavia Muckdogs players
Greensboro Grasshoppers players
Jupiter Hammerheads players
Clinton LumberKings players
Pensacola Blue Wahoos players
Jacksonville Jumbo Shrimp players